The Democratic Party of Korea held a leadership election on 27 August 2016. It was to elect a successor to interim leader Kim Chong-in, who was the leader of the 2016 legislative election. The elected leader was slated to serve a 2-year term.

The new leader, Choo Mi-ae was the first leader from Daegu–Gyeongbuk (TK) region in the history of the Democratic Party.

Candidates

Dropped out 
 Song Young-gil, member of the National Assembly, former Mayor of Incheon.

Advance to the finals 
 Kim Sang-gon, former Superintendent of Education of Gyeonggi Province.
 Lee Jong-kul, member of the National Assembly, former Floor leader of the party.
 Choo Mi-ae, member of the National Assembly.

Results 
The ratio of the results by sector was 45% for delegates, 30% for party members, 15% for opinion poll and 10% for non-voting members poll.

References 

Minjoo Party of Korea
Democratic
Democratic
Political party leadership elections in South Korea
Democratic Party of Korea leadership election